Takuan (also spelled takuwan), or takuan-zuke ('pickled takuan'), known as danmuji in the context of Korean cuisine, is a pickled preparation of daikon radish. As a popular part of traditional Japanese cuisine, takuan is often served uncooked alongside other types of tsukemono ('pickled things'). It is also enjoyed at the end of meals to aid digestion.

History
In Japan, famous Buddhist monk Takuan Sōhō (1573–1645) is popularly credited with creating this yellow pickle, which now bears his name.

Usage

Usually, takuan is washed with water to remove excess brine and then sliced thinly before serving. It is eaten as a side dish during meals, and eaten as a snack at teatime. Strip-cut takuan is often used for Japanese bento. Traditional takuan—using daikon radish that has been sun-dried and then pickled in a rice bran bed—is sometimes stir-fried or braised when getting older and sour. Some sushi rolls use strip-cut takuan for ingredients, e.g. shinkomaki (takuan only) and torotaku-maki (maguro [fatty tuna] and takuan).

In Korea
Takuan is called danmuji in Korea. Danmuji is a common banchan (side dish) served with bunsik (light meal or snack), as well as with Korean Chinese dishes.

Production

In the traditional process of making takuan, the first step is to hang a daikon radish in the sun for a few weeks by the leaves until it becomes dehydrated and flexible.  Next, the daikon is placed in a pickling crock and covered with a mixture of salt, rice bran, optionally sugar, daikon greens, kombu, and perhaps chilli pepper and/or dried persimmon peels.  A weight is then placed on top of the crock, and the daikon is allowed to pickle for several months.  The finished takuan is usually yellow in color and quite pungent.

Most mass-produced takuan uses salt or syrup to reduce the dehydration time, and artificial color to enhance the appearance.

Iburi-gakko (lit. 'smoked takuan') is eaten in Akita Prefecture in the North. It is smoked rather than sun-dried before pickling.

Gallery

See also

 
 
 
 
 Rick Kreembles Takuan cooking

References

External links
 Tokyo Central Pickle Co., Ltd.  History of Takuan and Its Varieties.

Japanese pickles
Japanese cuisine terms
Korean Chinese cuisine
Buddhist cuisine